Romania's major historical sites, known as monumente istorice, are listed in the National Register of Historic Monuments in Romania, which was created between 2004 and 2005. The National Register contains 29,540 Heritage sites are entered in the National Cultural Heritage of Romania and it is maintained by the Romanian National Institute of Historical Monuments, part of the Ministry of Culture and National Patrimony Romania.

List by County

Alba County

Arad County

Argeș County

Bacău County

Bihor County

Bistrița-Năsăud County

Botoșani County

Brăila County

Brașov County

Bucharest

Buzău County

Călărași County

Caraș-Severin County 
 Reșița Steam Locomotive Museum

Cluj County

Constanța County 
 Constanța Casino
 Genoese Lighthouse

Covasna County

Dâmbovița County

Dolj County

Galați County

Giurgiu County 
Giurgiu Clocktower

Gorj County

Harghita County

Hunedoara County

Ialomița County

Iași County

Ilfov County

Maramureș County

Mehedinți County

Mureș County

Neamț County

Olt County

Prahova County

Sălaj County

Satu Mare County

Sibiu County

Suceava County 
 Vatra Dornei Casino

Teleorman County

Timiș County

Tulcea County

Vâlcea County

Vaslui County

Vrancea County

See also 
 National Register of Historic Monuments in Romania
 List of heritage registers
 List of museums in Romania
 List of castles in Romania
 List of religious buildings in Romania
 UNESCO World Heritage Sites in Romania
 List of ancient cities in Thrace and Dacia
 Romanian archaeology
 Archaeological cultures in Romania
 Archaeological sites in Romania
 Culture of Romania

Notes

References

External links 
 List of Historical Monuments at Romanian National Institute of Historical Monuments (in Romanian)
 Monuments listed by UNESCO in Romania at Romanian Ministry of Culture and National Patrimony (in Romanian)
 eGISpat geographic information system by Romanian National Institute of Historical Monuments (includes LMI lookup)
 National Archaeological Record of Romania (RAN) by Romanian Ministry of Culture and National Patrimony
 Mapserver for Romanian National Cultural Heritage by Romanian Institute for Cultural Memory
  	Monuments and sites in Romania viewable on Google Earth at Romanian Ministry of Culture and National Patrimony (in Romanian)
 Dacian fortresses, settlements and Roman castra from Romania: Google Maps / Google Earth

 
Archaeological sites in Romania
Ruins in Romania
History of Eastern Romance people
 
Romanian culture
Historical monuments
Archaeology-related lists
Monuments
Historical monuments